Hartberg-Fürstenfeld is a district in Styria, Austria. It came into effect on January 1, 2013, by merging of the districts of Hartberg and Fürstenfeld.

Municipalities
Since the 2015 Styria municipal structural reform, it consists of the following municipalities:

 Bad Blumau
 Bad Loipersdorf
 Bad Waltersdorf
 Buch-Sankt Magdalena
 Burgau
 Dechantskirchen
 Ebersdorf
 Feistritztal
 Friedberg
 Fürstenfeld
 Grafendorf bei Hartberg
 Greinbach
 Großsteinbach
 Großwilfersdorf
 Hartberg
 Hartberg Umgebung
 Hartl
 Ilz
 Kaindorf
 Lafnitz
 Neudau
 Ottendorf an der Rittschein
 Pinggau
 Pöllau
 Pöllauberg
 Rohr bei Hartberg
 Rohrbach an der Lafnitz
 Sankt Jakob im Walde
 Sankt Johann in der Haide
 Sankt Lorenzen am Wechsel
 Schäffern
 Söchau
 Stubenberg
 Vorau
 Waldbach-Mönichwald
 Wenigzell

References

 
Districts of Styria
States and territories established in 2013
2013 establishments in Austria